Ryan McCluskey (born 2 June 1981) is a Gaelic footballer who plays for Enniskillen Gaels and the Fermanagh county team.

He previously played association football for NIFL Premiership clubs Portadown and Dungannon Swifts.

As of the end of the 2021 season, he had made 80 appearances for Fermanagh.

References

 http://hoganstand.com/fermanagh/ArticleForm.aspx?ID=75279
 http://hoganstand.com/fermanagh/ArticleForm.aspx?ID=105961

1981 births
Living people
Enniskillen Gaels Gaelic footballers
Fermanagh inter-county Gaelic footballers
Gaelic footballers who switched code
People from Enniskillen
Portadown F.C. players
Dungannon Swifts F.C. players
Association footballers not categorized by position
Association footballers from Northern Ireland